Amos Nelson Wilson (February 23, 1941 (or 1940) — January 14, 1995) was an African-American theoretical psychologist, social theorist, Pan-African thinker, scholar, author and a professor of psychology at the City University of New York.

Early life and education
Born in Hattiesburg, Mississippi, in 1940 or 1941, Wilson completed his undergraduate degree at the Morehouse College in Atlanta, Georgia, master degree at The New School of Social Research, and attained a PhD degree from Fordham University in New York. Wilson worked as a psychologist, social caseworker, supervising probation officer and as a training administrator in the New York City Department of Juvenile Justice. As an academic, Wilson also taught at City University of New York from 1981 to 1986 and at the College of New Rochelle from 1987 to 1995.

Views on power and racism

According to AALBC.com, "Wilson believed that the vast power differentials between Africans and non-Africans was the major social problem of the 21st century. He believed these power differentials, and not simply racist attitudes, was chiefly responsible for the existence of racism, and the continuing domination of people of African descent across the globe—white people exercise racism because they have the power to do so."

As a scholar of Africana studies, Wilson felt that the social, political and economic problems that Blacks faced, the world over, were unlike those of other ethnic groups; and thus, he argued that the concept of "equal education" ought to be abandoned in favor of a philosophy and approach appropriate to their own needs. Wilson argued that the function of education and intelligence was to solve the problems particular to a people and nation, and to secure that people and nation's biological survival. Any philosophy of education or approach which failed to do so was inadequate.

Wilson further argued that the mythological notion of progress to which many Blacks subscribe, was a false one; that integration could only occur and persist, as a social-economic reality, so long as the U.S. and global economies continued to expand. If such an economic situation were ever to reverse, or change for the worse, then the consequences which would follow could end up resulting in increased racial conflict; thus he urged Blacks to consider disintegration as a realistic possibility — to prepare for all hypothetical scenarios — with the understanding that integration was not guaranteed to last forever.

Wilson also believed that racism was a structurally and institutionally driven phenomenon derived from the inequities of power relations between groups, and could persist even if and when more overt expressions of it were no longer present. Racism, then, could only be neutralized by transforming society (structurally) and the system of power relations.

Books
 The Developmental Psychology of the Black Child (1978)
 Black-on-Black Violence: The Psychodynamics of Black Self-Annihilation in Service of White Domination (1990)
 Understanding Black Adolescent Male Violence: Its Remediation and Prevention (1992)
 Awakening the Natural Genius of Black Children (1992)
 The Falsification of Afrikan Consciousness: Eurocentric History, Psychiatry and the Politics of White Supremacy (1993)
 Blueprint for Black Power: A Moral, Political and Economic Imperative for the Twenty-First Century (1998)
 Afrikan-Centered Consciousness Versus the New World Order: Garveyism in the Age of Globalism (1999) 
 The Developmental Psychology of the Black Child — Second Edition (2014)
 Issues of Manhood in Black and White: An Incisive Look at Masculinity and the Societal Definition of Afrikan Man (2016)
 The Psychology of Self-Hatred and Self-Defeat: Towards a Reclamation of the Afrikan Mind Paperback – (January 1, 2020)

References

External links
 "Dr. Amos Wilson’s Last Interview (1995)", African Blood Siblings.

African-American philosophers
People from Hattiesburg, Mississippi
African-American psychologists
20th-century American psychologists
Black studies scholars
African-American writers
American pan-Africanists
1941 births
1995 deaths
Fordham University alumni
Morehouse College alumni
The New School alumni
Philosophers from Mississippi
Philosophers from New York (state)
Academics from Mississippi
20th-century American philosophers
20th-century African-American people